"Lascolabacillus" is a genus from the family of Porphyromonadaceae, with one known species ("Lascolabacillus massiliensis").

References

Bacteroidia
Bacteria genera
Monotypic bacteria genera